Chen Chuanxi, (May 1916 in Xining, Guangxi – January 27, 2012), is a Chinese conductor. He is regarded, along with Han Zhongjie, Li Delun and Yin Shengshan, as one of the Four Great Chinese Conductors.

After beginning his career as a librettist and conductor during the War against Japanese Occupation, he worked simultaneously at the Shanghai City Orchestra and Shanghai Music Academy from 1949.

References

External links

1916 births
2012 deaths
Chinese conductors (music)
Republic of China musicians
People's Republic of China musicians
Musicians from Guangxi
People from Nanning